Biografía española. D. Francisco Martínez Marina

Francisco Xavier Martinez Marina (1754–1833)  was a noted Spanish jurist, historian and priest.

Born in Oviedo, capital city of the Principality of Asturias in northern Spain, he was director of the Real Academia de la Historia, an institution dedicated to the study of Spain's political, civilian, ecclesiastical and military history. He also served as director of the Real Academia Española (Royal Spanish Academy), an institution responsible for regulating the Spanish language.

During his lifetime, Marina published a number of well-known texts, including a treatise on the history and geography of Asturias, Diccionario geográfico-histórico de Asturias, and a study of principles of morality as they relate to legal policy and legislation,  Principios naturales de la moral, de la política y de la legislación.

Marina also wrote diverse works on the history of Spanish law, including Ensayo histórico-crítico sobre la legislación y principales cuerpos legales de los reinos de León y Castilla especialmente sobre el código de las Siete Partidas de D. Alonso el Sabio (a study of the Siete Partidas, Spain's seven-part legal code that was followed for centuries both there and in Latin America), and a work entitled Juicio crítico de la Novísima Recopilación (Analysis of the Latest Compilation).

Marina died in 1833, a resident of Zaragoza, the capital city of the autonomous region and former kingdom of Aragon in Spain.

References
Francisco Martínez Marina. From the Spanish-language Wikipedia. Retrieved May 11, 2006.

1754 births
1833 deaths
Spanish jurists
19th-century Spanish historians
18th-century Spanish Roman Catholic priests
Afrancesados
Members of the Royal Spanish Academy
People from Asturias
People from Oviedo
Liberal Catholicism
18th-century Spanish historians